Frank Ashley may refer to:

Frank Ashley Day Middle School
Frank Ashley (skier) in Colorado Ski and Snowboard Hall of Fame

See also
Francis Ashley (1569–1635), English lawyer and politician